Signs of Life is an album by jazz guitarist Peter Bernstein that was released by Criss Cross Jazz in 1995.

Track listing

Personnel
 Peter Bernstein – guitar
 Brad Mehldau – piano
 Christian McBride – double bass
 Gregory Hutchinson – drums

References

1995 albums
Peter Bernstein albums
Criss Cross Jazz albums